The Quinto River, also known as the Popopis, is in central Argentina.

It rises in Sierra de San Luis near the Retama mountain in San Luis Province. The Quinto flows to the southeast. Near the Paso de las Carreteras dam, the Quinto River begins to flow through the Pampas. It then flows through Córdoba Province. Finally, it flows into the Bañados de la Amarga swamps in its lower course. During the rainy season the Quinto's waters sometimes rise sufficiently to reach Santa Fé and Buenos Aires provinces and sometimes even as far as the Salado River basin. The Quinto's length is dependent on the season.

Rivers of Argentina